The 2019–20 Mississippi State Bulldogs basketball team represented Mississippi State University in the 2019–20 NCAA Division I men's basketball season. The Bulldogs, led by fifth-year head coach Ben Howland, played their home games at Humphrey Coliseum in Starkville, Mississippi as members of the Southeastern Conference. They finished the season 20–11, 11–7 in SEC play to finish in a tie for fourth place. They were set to be the No. 4 seed in the SEC tournament with a bye to the quarterfinals. However, the SEC Tournament and all other postseason tournaments were cancelled amid the COVID-19 pandemic.

Previous season
The Bulldogs finished the 2018–19 season 23–11, 10–8 in SEC play to finish in a tie for sixth place. They defeated Texas A&M in the second round of the SEC tournament before losing in the quarterfinals to Tennessee. They were received an at-large bid to the NCAA tournament where were defeated by Liberty in the first round.

Offseason

Departures

Incoming transfers

2019 recruiting class

2020 Recruiting class

Preseason

SEC media poll
The SEC media poll was released on October 15, 2019.

Preseason All-SEC teams
The Bulldogs had one player selected to the preseason all-SEC teams.

First Team

Reggie Perry

Roster

Schedule and results

|-
!colspan=12 style=|Exhibition

|-
!colspan=12 style=|Regular season

|-
!colspan=12 style=| SEC tournament

References

Mississippi State Bulldogs men's basketball seasons
Mississippi State
Mississippi State Bulldogs men's
Mississippi State Bulldogs men's